Miló of Narbonne (fl. 752–782) was the Count of Narbonne, who was ruling in 752, successor probably of Gilbert. It seems that he was in favour of the Franks, but, as there was a Muslim garrison in Narbonne, he didn't follow Ansemund, Count of Nimes in his allegiance to the Frankish Kingdom. The Goth counts and the Franks started to besiege Narbonne. Miló left the city toward Trausse, near Caunes, awaiting the result of the struggle. The Muslim troop resisted for about seven years. Narbonne capitulated in 759 and then the Frankish granted the county to Miló. He was last known to have lived in 782.

Frankish warriors
People from Narbonne
8th-century Frankish nobility
8th-century Visigothic people